Kamchatka Oblast was a federal subject of Russia until June 30, 2007.  On July 1, 2007, it was merged with Koryak Autonomous Okrug to form Kamchatka Krai.

Towns under the federal government management:
Vilyuchinsk (Вилючинск)
Cities and towns under the oblast's jurisdiction:
Petropavlovsk-Kamchatsky (Петропавловск-Камчатский) (administrative center)
Yelizovo (Елизово)
Districts:
Aleutsky (Алеутский)
Bystrinsky (Быстринский)
Milkovsky (Мильковский)
with 7 rural okrugs under the district's jurisdiction.
Sobolevsky (Соболевский)
with 4 rural okrugs under the district's jurisdiction.
Ust-Bolsheretsky (Усть-Большерецкий)
Urban-type settlements under the district's jurisdiction:
Oktyabrsky (Октябрьский)
Ozernovsky (Озерновский)
with 4 rural okrugs under the district's jurisdiction.
Ust-Kamchatsky (Усть-Камчатский)
Urban-type settlements under the district's jurisdiction:
Ust-Kamchatsk (Усть-Камчатск)
with 1 rural okrug under the district's jurisdiction.
Yelizovsky (Елизовский)
Urban-type settlements under the district's jurisdiction:
Vulkanny (Вулканный)
with 8 rural okrugs under the district's jurisdiction.

See also
Administrative divisions of Koryak Autonomous Okrug
Administrative divisions of Kamchatka Krai

References

Kamchatka Krai
Kamchatka